The following highways are numbered 862:

United States

Germany
 Bundesautobahn 862